Harmony Township is one of ten townships in Posey County, Indiana. As of the 2000 census, its population was 1,473.

History
Harmony Township was organized in 1821. A large share of the first settlers being Harmonites caused the name to be selected.

The James Elliott Farm and New Harmony Historic District are listed on the National Register of Historic Places.

Adjacent townships
 Indiana
 Posey County
 Center Township (Southeast)
 Lynn Township (South)
 Robb Township (Northeast)
 Illinois
 White County
Hawthorne Township (Southwest)
Phillips Township (Northwest)

Cities
New Harmony

Unincorporated places
Rapture

References

External links
 Indiana Township Association
 United Township Association of Indiana

Townships in Posey County, Indiana
Townships in Indiana